A Life in the Death of Joe Meek is a 2013 American independent documentary film about the British record producer Joe Meek. The film is produced and directed by Howard S. Berger and Susan Stahman.

Synopsis
Joe Meek was one of Britain's premier independent record producers of the late fifties and early sixties, renowned for his pioneering recording techniques and for the futuristic sound of the records he produced, but notorious for his eccentric personality. His biggest success was the production of the Tornados' 1962 worldwide #1 hit "Telstar". After a long struggle with debt, paranoia and depression, he killed his landlady Violet Shenton and shot himself on February 3, 1967.

The documentary was shown as a work-in-progress on the opening night of the 2008 Sensoria Music & Film Festival in Sheffield, on April 12, 2008. Later in 2008 it was shown at the Cambridge Film Festival and the Raindance Film Festival in London. A North American premiere of the film opened the Chattanooga Film Festival on April 3, 2014.

The documentary contains over 60 interviews with Meek's family, close friends, associates, musicians and pop culture movers and shakers.

Interviewees

Jimmy Page
Steve Howe
Keith Strickland
Edwyn Collins
Alex Kapranos
Huw Bunford (Super Furry Animals)
Marc Evans
Jake Arnott
Mike Stax (Ugly Things)
Liam Watson
Humphrey Lyttelton
Chas Hodges (The Outlaws)
Simon Napier-Bell
Big Jim Sullivan
John Leyton
Dave Adams
Joy Adams
Doug Collins (The Blue Men)
Dave Golding (The Blue Men)
Clem Cattini (The Tornados)
Roger LaVern (The Tornados)
Pete Holder (The Tornados)
Roger Holder (The Tornados)
Robb Huxley (The Tornados)
Dave Watts (The Tornados)
Dennis D'Ell (The Honeycombs)
Honey Lantree	(The Honeycombs)
John Lantree (The Honeycombs)
Bobby Graham (The Outlaws)
Reg Hawkins (The Outlaws)
Billy Kuy (The Outlaws)
Gary Leport (The Moontrekkers)
Ritchie Routledge (The Cryin' Shames)
Ricky Winter (The Saints)
Guy Fletcher (songwriter)
Ted Fletcher
Mike Berry
Keith Grant
Adrian Kerridge
Jimmy Lock
Allen Stagg
Tony Dangerfield
David John
Charles Blackwell
Jason Eddie
Robbie Duke aka Patrick Pink
Kim Pavey
John Repsch
Barry Cleveland
John Cavanaugh
John Beecher
Mark Newson
John O'Kill
Eric Meek
Marlene Meek
Sandra Meek-Williams

References

External links
 
The filmmakers' website about the documentary, on Myspace Retrieved August 11, 2012
 joemeekdoc.com The Filmmakers' website about the documentary Retrieved May 20, 2014

2008 films
2008 drama films
American documentary films
Films set in the 1950s
Films set in the 1960s
Rockumentaries
2000s English-language films
2000s American films